Antizyme inhibitor 1 is a protein that in humans is encoded by the AZIN1 gene.

Ornithine decarboxylase (ODC) catalyzes the conversion of ornithine to putrescine in the first and apparently rate-limiting step in polyamine biosynthesis. Ornithine decarboxylase antizymes play a role in the regulation of polyamine synthesis by binding to and inhibiting ornithine decarboxylase. The protein encoded by this gene is highly similar to ODC. It binds to ODC antizyme and stabilizes ODC, thus inhibiting antizyme-mediated ODC degradation. Two alternatively spliced transcript variants have been found for this gene.

References

External links

Further reading